Tonya R. Moore is an award-nominated speculative fiction author, editor, and poet. She was born in Jamaica and currently lives in Florida.

Writing career
In 2020, Moore became Poetry Acquiring Editor at FIYAH Literary Magazine; she also published her omnibus of science fiction, fantasy, and horror stories: Odes to the Multiverse. In 2022, Moore was nominated for the Hugo Award in the Best Semi-Prozine category for her work with FIYAH. The same year, she was one of three finalists for the Analog Award for Emerging Black Voices and she was named a Voodoonauts Fellow.

Her latest project is Speculative Fiction Multiverse, "a quarterly Online Magazine and social network created for science fiction, fantasy, horror fans, creators, and industry professionals," for which she is Founder/Editor in Chief.

Personal life
Moore was born in Jamaica, and she currently resides in Sebring, Florida.

Awards
Hugo Award Finalist, Semi-Prozine category, 2022
Analog Award for Emerging Black Voices, 2022, Finalist

References

External links
 

Living people
21st-century American poets
21st-century African-American writers
Black speculative fiction authors
American science fiction writers
African-American women writers
Jamaican women writers
Jamaican women poets
21st-century American women writers
21st-century Jamaican poets
Women science fiction and fantasy writers
Year of birth missing (living people)